New California is a census-designated place in central Jerome Township, Union County, Ohio, United States.

Demographics

History
New California was platted in 1853. According to tradition, news of a man passing through the settlement to California caused the name to be selected. The New California Post office was established on January 7, 1850, but was discontinued on May 14, 1904. The mail service is now sent through the Plain City branch.

On September 19, 2009, a new Ohio historical marker was dedicated in New California. The marker symbolizes the fact that 367 men from Jerome Township joined the Union cause, giving it one of the highest per capita rates for service in the nation during the American Civil War, and also the fact that seventeen of those veterans are buried in the community's small cemetery.

References

Census-designated places in Union County, Ohio